The 2014 Campeonato Amapaense de Futebol was the 69th edition of the Amapá's top professional football league. The competition began on March, and ended on May 17. Santos-AP won the championship for the third time.

Format

The four teams will play two rounds. On each round, the two best teams from the round will play in the round finals. The winner from first round will face the second round winner in the championship final.

Participating teams

First round

Results

Final

Second round

Results

Final

References

Amapaense
2014